Glow is the title of Donavon Frankenreiter's fourth album, released on October 5, 2010.

Track listing
"Intro" - :38 (Weinburg)
"Glow" - 3:21 (Nathanson; Weinburg)
"Keeping Me Away From You" - 3:27 (Frankenreiter; Weinburg)
"Shadows" - 3:32 (Cockrell; Frankenreiter)
"Push" - 3:30 (Koops; Stucchi; Weinburg)
"The Ones In Your Dreams" - 2:32 (Frankenreiter)
"Home" - 3:01 (Frankenreiter)
"Dance Like Nobody's Watching" - 3:42 (Fox; Frankenreiter; Frasier)
"Allright" - 3:07 (Frankenreiter; Phillips)
"Hold On" - 2:34 (Frankenreiter)
Three/Outro - 4:44 (Frankenreiter; Weinburg)

Personnel
Mark Weinburg - Producer, Composer
Ryan Williams - Mix Engineer, Recording Engineer
Gene Grimaldi - Mastering Engineer
Zack Stucchi - Composer
Gary Jules - Composer
Steve Fox - Composer
Jake Koops - Composer
Matt Nathanson - Composer
Grant Lee Phillips - Composer
Thad Cockrell - Composer
Stan Frazier - Composer
Rainman - Programming & Sequencing
Donavon Frankenreiter - Guitar, Vocals, Composer
Matt Grundy - Bass, Vocals
Clay Hawkins - Vocals
Mozella - Vocals
Michael Chaves - Guitar
Aaron Sterling - Drums, Percussion
Zac Rae - Keyboards, Strings

Charts

References 

2010 albums
Donavon Frankenreiter albums